Larkinella arboricola  is a Gram-negative, aerobic, chemoorganotrophic, mesophilic, moderately acidophilic and spiral-shaped  bacterium from the genus of Larkinella which has been isolated from decomposing wood in Moscow in Russia.

References

External links
Type strain of Larkinella arboricola at BacDive -  the Bacterial Diversity Metadatabase	

Cytophagia
Bacteria described in 2010